The 2008 Superbike World Championship was the twenty-first season of the Superbike World Championship. Corona Extra ceased to be the championship's title sponsor, as it had been since 1998. The electronics  manufacturer HANNspree took over as the title sponsor in 2008 and this arrangement remained in place until 2010, with the championship officially known as the "HANNspree SBK Superbike World Championship".

The Superbike World Championship returned to the United States on 1 June 2008, for the 2008 6th round of the Superbike World Championship. The round took place at the Miller Motorsports Park near Salt Lake City, Utah. This was the first time SBK had raced in the United States since the 2004 round at Mazda Raceway Laguna Seca. The Superbike World Championship shared the weekend with the AMA Superbike Championship and its support classes. However to avoid direct comparisons between World Superbike and AMA Superbike, and because of sponsorship issues the two championships raced on different configurations of the circuit. World Superbikes used the  Outer Track, while AMA Superbike and its support classes used the  Main Track.

The provisional championship calendar was made up of 15 rounds but the Indonesian round in Sentul International Circuit was removed from the final calendar.

Australian rider Troy Bayliss won his third Superbike World Championship riding the factory supported Ducati 1098. He secured the title with his 50th race win at the second race at Magny-Cours.

Race calendar and results

Championship standings

Riders' standings

Manufacturers' standings

Entry list

Notes

References

 
Superbike World Championship seasons
World